The 1929 U.S. National Championships (now known as the US Open) was a tennis tournament that took place on the outdoor grass courts at the West Side Tennis Club, Forest Hills in New York City, United States. The men's tournament ran from 7 September until 14 September, while the women's event took place from 19 August to 24 August. It was the 49th staging of the U.S. National Championships and the fourth Grand Slam tennis event of the year. In the men's singles competition Bill Tilden won his record seventh and final singles title.

Champions

Men's singles

 Bill Tilden defeated  Francis Hunter  3–6, 6–3, 4–6, 6–2, 6–4

Women's singles

 Helen Wills defeated  Phoebe Holcroft Watson  6–4, 6–2

Men's doubles
 George Lott /  John Doeg defeated  Berkeley Bell /  Lewis White 10–8, 16–14, 6–1

Women's doubles
 Phoebe Holcroft Watson /  Peggy Michell defeated  Phyllis Covell /  Dorothy Shepherd-Barron 2–6, 6–3, 6–4

Mixed doubles
 Betty Nuthall /  George Lott defeated  Phyllis Covell /  Bunny Austin 6–3, 6–3

References

External links
Official US Open website

 
U.S. National Championships
U.S. National Championships (tennis) by year
U.S. National Championships
U.S. National Championships
U.S. National Championships
U.S. National Championships